The Dell Venue (previously known as codename Dell Thunder) is a line of Android smartphones and tablets manufactured by Dell. The first Dell Venue was released for both T-Mobile and AT&T in the United States, and for KT in South Korea. It was the second Dell smartphone to be released in the US and features the Dell Stage UI also found on the Dell Streak line of tablets.  , it was the only Android device the United States Department of Defense has approved for its employees use. Since then, there have been other approved devices.

On June 30, 2016, Dell discontinued the Venue line of products and ended support for currently supported products.

Repositioning of Dell Venue brand 
In December 2012, Dell announced that they would quit the smartphone business and discontinue their line of Dell Venue smartphones. On October 2, 2013, Dell announced that they would revive the Dell Venue brand and transform it into a tablet brand. The Dell Venue brand includes both Windows and Android tablets, with the Windows tablets having the suffix 'Pro'.

In October 2013, Dell announced the first four new Dell Venue tablets. The Dell Venue 7 and Dell Venue 8 are both Android tablets powered the Intel Clover Trail+ Atom processor. The Dell Venue 8 Pro and Dell Venue 11 Pro are both Windows 8.1 tablets powered by the Intel Bay Trail Atom processor. The number after Venue indicates the screen size.

In January 2015, the Dell Venue 8 7000 was released. It has an 8.4-inch screen and it is 0.24 inch in width and weighs 10.72 oz. The OLED screen has 2560 x 1600 resolution and 361 pixels per inch. Its CPU is a 2.3 GHz quad-core Intel Atom Z3580 processor with 2GB of RAM. It has 16GB of internal space with about 9GB usable, due to pre-installed software, and it has a micro SD card slot as of Dell Latitude 12 Rugged Tablet.

See also
Dell Streak
Dell Venue Pro
List of Android devices

References

External links 

Google Phone Gallery Listing

Android (operating system) devices
Dell mobile phones